Edward Nourse, FRS (1701–1761) was an English surgeon.

Family
His father, also called Edward Nourse (d. 1738) was a surgeon in Oxford. His mother was Elizabeth Towersey (1680–1740). His brother was John Nourse the bookseller. Another brother Charles Nourse was a doctor in Oxford who took over their father's practice in that town.

Career
On 2 December 1717, he was apprenticed until 1725 to John Dobyns, an assistant surgeon at St Bartholomew's Hospital, London. Nourse became an Assistant Surgeon himself in 1731 and Surgeon in 1745.

He was elected to the Royal Society on 24 October 1728.

References

1701 births
1738 deaths
English surgeons
Fellows of the Royal Society